The Japan men's national 3x3 team represents Japan in international 3x3 (3 against 3) basketball competitions. It is governed by the Japan Basketball Association (JBA). (Japanese: 日本バスケットボール協会)

It represents the country in international 3x3 (3 against 3) basketball competitions.

As of late 2019, the head coach has been Torsten Loibl.

Tournament record

Olympic Games

World Cup

Asia Cup

{| class="wikitable" style="text-align: center;"
|-
!Year
!Position
!width=25px|
!width=25px|
!width=25px|
!Players
|-
|style="text-align: left;"| 2013 Doha
|
|3
|1
|2
|Aoki, S.Hasegawa, T.Hasegawa, Ikeda
|-
|style="text-align: left;"| 2017 Ulaanbaatar
|8th
|3
|1
|2
|Hilke, Komatsu, Ochiai, Kawachi
|-bgcolor="#cc9966"
|style="text-align: left;"| 2018 Shenzhen
|3rd 
|5
|3
|2
|Komatsu, Noro, Ochiai, Suzuki
|-
|style="text-align: left;"| 2019 Changsha
|7th
|3
|1
|2
|Fujitaka, Kobayashi, Sugiura, Yasuoka

Asian Games

Team

Current roster
Source: 

}

Practice facilities
Ajinomoto National Training Center

See also
Japan men's national under-23 3x3 team
Japan women's national 3x3 team
Japan men's national basketball team

References

External links
 

3x3